Konstantinos Petimezas (Greek: Κωνσταντίνος Πετιμεζάς) (1764–1824) was a Greek revolutionary leader during the Greek War of Independence and a soldier.

He was born in 1764 in Soudena near Kalavryta. He had a brother Anagnostis and was descended from the historic Petmezades family.  He left after his father was assassinated in 1804 to Zakynthos and became a Russian army officer.  He entered the Filiki Etaireia and took part of the Siege of Tripoli, Battle of Levidi,  Battle of Nafplio, and the Siege of Patras.  He took part in the national council of Astros.  In the civil war, he teamed up with Theodoros Kolokotronis.

He died in 1824.

References
Fotakou apomnimonevmata (Φωτάκου απομνημονεύματα), Vergina publishers, 1996
''This article is translated and is based from the article at the Greek Wikipedia (el:Main Page)

1764 births
1824 deaths
Greek military leaders of the Greek War of Independence
Konstantinos
Members of the Filiki Eteria
People from Kalavryta
Members of the Hellenic Parliament